Around the Corner is a 1930 American comedy-drama film directed by Bert Glennon and starring George Sidney,  Charles Murray and Joan Peers. It was produced and distributed by Columbia Pictures.

Cast
 George Sidney as Kaplan  
 Charles Murray as O'Grady  
 Joan Peers as Rosie  
 Charles Delaney as Terry Callahan  
 Larry Kent as Tommy Sinclair  
 Jesse De Vorska as Moe Levine  
 Frederick Sullivan as Sinclair Sr  
 Harry Strang as Mac

References

Bibliography
 Alan G. Fetrow. Sound films, 1927-1939: a United States filmography. McFarland, 1992.

External links
 

1930 films
1930 comedy-drama films
American comedy-drama films
Films directed by Bert Glennon
Columbia Pictures films
American black-and-white films
1930s English-language films
1930s American films